Cape Vilan is a rock-bound peninsula on the  west coast of Galicia, Spain, located in Costa da Morte ("Coast of Death"), specifically close the village of Camariñas. The place was declared of National Interest in 1933 and today is a Natural Monument. However, near the cape was installed a wind farm and a fish farm breeding turbot.

The Cape Vilan Lighthouse marks this dangerous sections of the Costa da Morte. Erected at 125 meters altitude and attached to the old building of the lighthouse keepers, it has a powerful light that can reach 55 km. It is the oldest electric lighthouse in Spain.

In 1890, the English ship HMS Serpent, which sailed to the Sierra Leone, sank near the cape because of a storm, perishing 173 men that were buried in the English Cemetery (Cemiterio dos Ingleses), a short distance out Cape Vilan.

External links
 Web oficial del Faro Vilán creada por la Asociación de Empresarios de Camariñas

Landforms of Galicia (Spain)
Tourist attractions in Galicia (Spain)
Peninsulas of Spain